{{DISPLAYTITLE:Omega2 Tauri}}

Omega2 Tauri is a solitary, white hued star in the zodiac constellation of Taurus. It has an apparent visual magnitude of +4.9,  which is bright enough to be seen with the naked eye at night. The distance to this system, as determined using an annual parallax shift of 34.55 mas as seen from the Earth, is about 94 light years.

This is a young Am star with an age of around 100 million years and a stellar classification of A3m. It displays an infrared excess emission, indicating the presence of an orbiting debris disk with a mean temperature of 99 K. This star is a probable member of the Octans Near association, a nearby moving group of stars that share a common motion through space.

References

Tauri, Omega
Taurus (constellation)
BD+20 0724
Tauri, 50
027045
019990
1329
Am stars